Nickerson Township may refer to one of the following places in the United States:

 Nickerson Township, Pine County, Minnesota
 Nickerson Township, Dodge County, Nebraska

Township name disambiguation pages